Thon Buri is one of the 50 districts (khet) of Bangkok, Thailand. On the west bank of Chao Phraya River, it was once part of Thon Buri province.  Neighboring districts are (from north clockwise) Bangkok Yai, Phra Nakhon (across Chao Phraya River), Khlong San, Bang Kho Laem (across Chao Phraya), Rat Burana, Chom Thong, and Phasi Charoen.

History
In addition to the native inhabitants, the district was settled relatively early by foreigners, first Chinese merchants, then the Portuguese after the fall of Ayutthaya to the Burmese in 1767. In addition to the Chinese and Portuguese, there were also Muslims and Mon, from Burma, as well as French priests, particularly in the neighbourhood called Kudi Chin. The area still retains many Chinese shrines, mosques, and Santa Cruz Church, the second Catholic church to be built in Thailand.

The district used to be called Ratchakhrue (ราชคฤห์) due to a nearby wat of the same name. It was renamed Bang Yi Ruea on 11 July 1916 (after the location of the new district office), and finally Thon Buri on 17 April 1939.  The district then belonged to Thon Buri province. In December 1971 the province was merged with Bangkok to form the present day Bangkok metropolitan area.

Administration
The district is divided into seven sub-districts (khwaengs).

Places
Taksin Monument and Wongwian Yai (วงเวียนใหญ่) (technically the monument lies on Khlong San side of boundary between Thon Buri and Khlong San Districts)
Santa Cruz Church
Wat Kanlayanamit
Wat Intharam
Wat Prayurawongsawat
First Presbyterian Church, Samray

Transportation
 Wongwian Yai is a major bus hub on the west side of the Chao Phraya River.
 The district is served by Bangkok Skytrain stations: Pho Nimit, Talad Phlu and Wutthakat. A Bangkok Skytrain Wongwian Yai station lies just outside Thon Buri District into Khlong San District.

Health 

 Somdech Phra Pinklao Hospital, Royal Thai Navy

References

External links
 BMA website with Thon Buri landmarks
 Thon Buri district office (Thai)

 
Districts of Bangkok